Yekaterina Khupovets is a Kazakhstani karateka. She won the silver medal in the women's kumite 50 kg event at the 2014 Asian Games held in Incheon, South Korea.

In 2010, she competed in the women's kumite 55 kg event at the Asian Games held in Guangzhou, China without winning a medal. She was eliminated in her first match by Fatemeh Chalaki. At the 2017 Asian Karate Championships held in Astana, Kazakhstan, she won one of the bronze medals in both the women's kumite 50 kg event and the women's team kumite events.

Achievements

References 

Living people
Year of birth missing (living people)
Place of birth missing (living people)
Kazakhstani female karateka
Karateka at the 2010 Asian Games
Karateka at the 2014 Asian Games
Medalists at the 2014 Asian Games
Asian Games medalists in karate
Asian Games silver medalists for Kazakhstan
21st-century Kazakhstani women